Sérgio Mendes' Favorite Things is a 1968 album by Sérgio Mendes.

Track listing
"My Favorite Things" (Richard Rodgers, Oscar Hammerstein)
"Tempo Feliz (Happy Times)" (Baden Powell, Vinícius de Moraes)
"Ponteio" (José Carlos Capinam, Edu Lobo)
"Veleiro (The Sailboat)" (Edu Lobo, Torquato Neto)
"A Banda" (Chico Buarque)
"I Say a Little Prayer" (Burt Bacharach, Hal David)
"Comin' Home Baby" (Bob Dorough, Ben Tucker)
"Boa Palavra (The Good Word)" (Caetano Veloso)
"O Mar é Meu Chão (The Sea is My Soil)" (Nelson Motta, Dori Caymmi)
"So What's New"  (John Pisano)

1968 albums
Sérgio Mendes albums
Albums conducted by Dave Grusin
Albums arranged by Dave Grusin
Albums produced by Nesuhi Ertegun
Atlantic Records albums